Jin Donghan (born 1961) is a Chinese ship engineer and the current president of Tianjin University. He is an alternate member of the 18th Central Committee of the Chinese Communist Party and 19th Central Committee of the Chinese Communist Party.

Biography
Jin graduated from Wuhan Institute of Marine Engineering (now part of Wuhan University of Technology) in 1982, majored in internal-combustion engineering. Jin received the National May 1 Labour Medal in 2003, and the first prize of National Science and Technology Progress Award in 2006. He was elected a member of the Chinese Academy of Engineering in 2009. In 2015, he was appointed as the president of Shanghai University. In 2017, he was appointed as the party secretary of Shanghai University (still the president). In 2019, he was appointed as the president of Tianjin University.

References

1961 births
Living people
Members of the Chinese Academy of Engineering
Presidents of Tianjin University
Presidents of Shanghai University
Educators from Shaoxing
Academic staff of Shanghai University
Wuhan University of Technology alumni
Alternate members of the 18th Central Committee of the Chinese Communist Party
Alternate members of the 19th Central Committee of the Chinese Communist Party
Engineers from Zhejiang
Politicians from Shaoxing
People's Republic of China politicians from Zhejiang
Chinese Communist Party politicians from Zhejiang
Academic staff of Tianjin University